3-2-1 Penguins! is an American sci-fi computer-animated Christian children's television series, initially launched on November 14, 2000 as a direct-to-video episode by Big Idea Entertainment with videos released between 2000 and 2003. The direct-to-video series held the top spot on the Soundscan kid video sales charts for its first 18 weeks of release, was the #1 seller on Christian Booksellers Association's video list in 2001, and had sold 1.5 million videos as of February 2009.

The 3-2-1 Penguins television series appeared on the Qubo blocks on NBC, Ion Television and Telemundo as well as the Qubo channel. It ran for three seasons with the first season consisting entirely of television broadcasts of the six original home videos. 3-2-1 Penguins continued in reruns until 2014. The series was a top-ranked show on NBC's Qubo Saturday morning kids block in 2008.

Overview
Twin siblings Jason and Michelle are spending summer with their British grandmother in the Poconos region of Pennsylvania. Grandmum has a collection of kitschy ceramic figurines, the most prized of which is four penguins in a rocket ship (a honeymoon gift from her deceased husband). In the first video, the twins accidentally drop the ship, but instead of breaking, it flies into the air and reveals the four penguins are really the troop of a real spaceship. One of the twins is then pulled into the ship, using the crew's Galeezle (shrinking) device, and taken on a galactic adventure. The adventure that ensues then ties into whatever moral dilemma that Jason and Michelle had struggled with in the show's opening scene. For example, in the debut episode, Trouble on Planet Wait-Your-Turn, the twins are struggling with taking turns playing a new video game and looking through their Granddad's telescope before Jason is transported to a whole planet of alien vacuums who similarly have trouble taking turns.

Characters

Main
Zidgel (voiced by Ron Wells (2000–03) and John Payne (2006–2008)) is the Rockhopper's captain and a king who appears to be a cross between James T. Kirk and Ted Baxter.
Midgel (voiced by Greg Mills (2000–2003) and Paul Dobson (2006–2008)) is the Rockhopper's engineer and pilot. Midgel sometimes shouts "Banzai!" and pulls out a Bonsai tree to trim a branch before driving the ship.
Fidgel (voiced by Page H. Hearn (2000–2003) and Lee Tockar (2006–2008)) is the doctor/scientist of the Rockhopper's crew. Many of his inventions are odd, but can also be useful such as the crew's object resizer gun, the Gleezle. From photos in the first episode, we see that Fidgel physically resembles Jason's and Michelle's grandpa, Grandmum's deceased husband.
Kevin (voiced by Ron Smith (2000–2003) and Michael Donovan (2006–2008)): While Kevin has no specific job on the ship other than cleaning, he is always ready to help when needed by the others. He also sometimes answers questions or solves problems without being aware of it.
Jason Conrad (voiced by Mark Marten (2000–2003) and Quinn Lord (2006–2008)) is a 7-year-old twin brother of Michelle who goes on adventures with the penguins.
Michelle Conrad is a 7-year-old twin sister of Jason who also goes with the penguins on some of their adventures. She is 5 minutes older than Jason. Michelle is voiced by Melissa Peterson (2000–2003) and Claire Corlett (2006–2008).
Grandmum (voiced by Pamela Thomas (2000), Annie Walker-Bright (2001), Kymberly Mellen (2001–2003), and Ellen Kennedy (2006–2008)) is Jason and Michelle's blue-haired British grandmother who often gives them advice from "The Good Book".

Recurring 
Baron von Cavitus (voiced by Garry Chalk): Originally known as Bert Bertman, he was a classmate of Fidgel's back when they were students at the Academy. He is the inventor of the Galeezle (the device which allows Jason and Michelle to be shrunken to Penguin size). Having been made fun of because of being a hamster, he went bad and tried to take over the Academy and name himself Honorary Dean of Evil. Some time later he built himself a robot suit and attempted to take over the galaxy.
Admiral Strap (voiced by Dale Wilson) is the Penguin's commanding officer. As strict and militaristic as he seems, he has a soft spot for Michelle. In the original six videos, Admiral Strap is never seen and communicates to the penguins via fax machine. In later series, he interacts via speakerphone with the Penguins in order to give them their missions.
Sol (voiced by Garry Chalk) is a wise old bartender at the Comet Lounge and friend of Jason, Michelle and the penguins, whom he also advises.

Episodes

Series overview

Season 1 (2000–06)
The first season was broadcast on Qubo from September 9, 2006 to December 2, 2006 and consisted of televising the direct-to-video shows that were originally released from November 14, 2000 to July 1, 2003.

Special (2006)

Season 2 (2007–08)
After airing the original videos in Season 1, Big Idea released new stories that were first aired on television (without releasing them first on video) for Season 2 and 3.

Season 3 (2008)

Broadcast
After originally being released exclusively on direct-to-home videos, 3-2-1 Penguins first aired on the Qubo blocks on NBC, Ion Television, and Telemundo, as well as on the Qubo channel with the airing of the original videos. This was soon followed with new episodes that premiered on television. The show has since aired on TBN and its children's block Smile of a Child on Saturdays until 2018. It also airs on DreamWorks Channel in select countries.

As of July 2020, the entire series was available to watch for free on Peacock on its launch.

As of June 2022, 25 episodes were available to watch on Yippee.

Home media 
The first six videos were released in direct-to-video format from November 14, 2000 to July 1, 2003 prior to introducing on the Qubo television block.

The first DVD compilation of the TV series Save the Planets! was released on September 1, 2008, including three episodes from the second season "The Green-eyed Monster", "More is More" and "Give and Let Give". The second DVD compilation Blast in Space! was released on February 1, 2009, including three episodes from the second season "Wiki Tiki", "Lazy Daze" and "Compassion Crashin'". The third compilation Escape from Planet Hold-A-Grudge! was released on October 20, 2009, including three episodes from the third and final season "Do Unto Brothers", "Oh, Mercy!" and "Between an Asteroid and a Hard Place".

The first video, "Trouble on Planet Wait-Your-Turn", was released as a bonus episode in the two VeggieTales DVD re-issues of Lyle the Kindly Viking Special Edition and Where's God When I'm S-Scared? 15th Anniversary Collector's Edition. The fourth video, "Runaway Pride at Lightstation Kilowatt", was also released in the re-issue of King George and the Ducky Special Edition.

On September 18, 2012, a two-disc complete DVD set contained the first three season-one episodes and the first ten season-two episodes, which is a total of 13 episodes.

Reception
Common Sense Media gave the show a three out of five stars, saying, "Parents need to know that this series carries clear moral messages and comes from a Christian perspective (the main characters say their bedtime prayers at the end of each episode). The messages themselves -- such as the virtue of patience -- are hard to argue with no matter what your religious bent."

References

External links
 

2000s American animated television series
2006 American television series debuts
2008 American television series endings
American children's animated comic science fiction television series
American children's animated education television series
American children's animated science fantasy television series
American children's animated space adventure television series
American computer-animated television series
Big Idea Entertainment television series
Christian animation
Christian children's television series
DreamWorks Classics
Television series about size change
Animated television series about penguins
NBC original programming
Qubo
Television series by Universal Television
Direct-to-video television series